German submarine U-426 was a Type VIIC U-boat of Nazi Germany's Kriegsmarine during World War II.

She carried out two patrols. She was a member of seven wolfpacks. She sank one ship.

She was sunk by an Australian aircraft on 8 January 1944

Design
German Type VIIC submarines were preceded by the shorter Type VIIB submarines. U-426 had a displacement of  when at the surface and  while submerged. She had two shafts and two  propellers.

U-426 was fitted with five  torpedo tubes (four fitted at the bow and one at the stern), fourteen torpedoes, one  SK C/35 naval gun, 220 rounds, and two twin  C/30 anti-aircraft guns. The boat had a complement of between forty-four and sixty.

Service history
The submarine was laid down on 20 June 1942 at the Danziger Werft (yard) at Danzig (now Gdansk), as yard number 127, launched on 6 February 1943 and commissioned on 12 May under the command of Kapitänleutnant Christian Reich.

She served with the 8th U-boat Flotilla from 12 May 1943 and the 11th flotilla from 1 October of that year.

Patrols and loss

The boat's first patrol was preceded by a trip from Kiel in Germany to Bergen in Norway. U-426 then left Bergen on 5 October 1943 and headed for the Atlantic Ocean via the gap between Iceland and the Faroe Islands. The submarine arrived in Brest in occupied France on 29 November.

Her second sortie began on 3 January 1944. On the eighth, she was attacked and sunk by depth charges dropped by an Australian Sunderland flying boat of No. 10 Squadron RAAF.

Fifty-one men went down with the U-boat; there were no survivors.

Wolfpacks
U-426 took part in seven wolfpacks, namely:
 Schlieffen (16 – 22 October 1943) 
 Siegfried (22 – 27 October 1943) 
 Siegfried 2 (27 – 30 October 1943) 
 Jahn (30 October – 2 November 1943) 
 Tirpitz 4 (2 – 8 November 1943) 
 Eisenhart 9 (9 – 10 November 1943)
 Schill 1 (16 – 21 November 1943)

Summary of raiding history

References

Bibliography

External links

German Type VIIC submarines
U-boats commissioned in 1943
U-boats sunk in 1944
U-boats sunk by Australian aircraft
U-boats sunk by depth charges
1943 ships
Ships built in Danzig
Ships lost with all hands
World War II submarines of Germany
World War II shipwrecks in the Atlantic Ocean
Maritime incidents in January 1944